Brenda Hillman (born March 27, 1951 in Tucson, Arizona) is an American poet and translator. She is the author of ten collections of poetry: White Dress, Fortress, Death Tractates, Bright Existence, Loose Sugar, Cascadia, Pieces of Air in the Epic, Practical Water, for which she won the LA Times Book Award for Poetry, Seasonal Works with Letters on Fire, which received the 2014 Griffin Poetry Prize and the Northern California Book Award for Poetry, and Extra Hidden Life, among the Days, which was awarded the Northern California Book Award for Poetry. Among the awards Hillman has received are the 2012 Academy of American Poets Fellowship, the 2005 William Carlos Williams Prize for poetry, and Fellowships from the National Endowment for the Arts and the Guggenheim Foundation. A professor of Creative Writing, she holds the Olivia Filippi Chair in Poetry at Saint Mary's College of California, in Moraga, California. Hillman is also involved in non-violent activism as a member of the Code Pink Working Group in the San Francisco Bay Area. In 2016, she was elected a Chancellor of the Academy of American Poets.

Biography
She was educated at Pomona College, and received her M.F.A. at the Iowa Writers' Workshop.  She is the Olivia Filippi Professor of Poetry at Saint Mary's College in Moraga, California.  She also taught during a residency at the Atlantic Center for the Arts.

Hillman met the writer Leonard Michaels (1933-2003) in Iowa City in 1975, they were married in Berkeley in 1976, which ended in divorce in the late 1980s. They had a daughter together. Currently, she is married to the poet Robert Hass.

Work
One of contemporary poetry's most eclectic and formally innovative writers, Brenda Hillman is known for poems that draw on elements of found texts and document, personal meditation, observation, and literary theory. Often described as “sensuous” and “luminescent,” Hillman's poetry investigates and pushes at the possibilities of form and voice, while remaining grounded in topics such as geology, the environment, politics, family, and spirituality. In an interview with Sarah Rosenthal, Hillman described her own understanding of form: “It is the artist’s job to make form. Not even to make it, but to allow it. Allow form. And all artists have a different relationship to it, and a different philosophy of it… I think that when you are trying to open up a territory—in this case I was working with a desire to open the lyric—you have to be greedy, in that you want more than you can do. And you’re always bound to fail.”

Brenda Hillman has published ten collections of poetry, all from Wesleyan University Press: White Dress (1985), Fortress (1989), Death Tractates (1992), Bright Existence (1993), Loose Sugar (1997), Cascadia (2001), Pieces of Air in the Epic (2005), and Practical Water (2009), for which she won the LA Times Book Award for Poetry. Her ninth collection of poetry, the final volume in her tetralogy of books about the classical elements, Seasonal Works with Letters on Fire (2013), received the International Griffin Poetry Prize for 2014, as well as the Northern California Book Award for Poetry and the California Book Award Gold Medal in Poetry. Her most recent book, Extra Hidden Life, among the Days, won the 2019 Northern California Book Award, and has been described as “her most radical poetry collection yet.” 

In her interview with Rosenthal, Hillman concluded by admitting: “I hope that whatever experiment and opening and wildness and exploration the poem has to go through—and I do mean the poem because I feel like I am in its hands when I’m writing—that it keeps human experience recognizable.”

Hillman is also the author of three chapbooks: Coffee, 3 A.M. (Penumbra Press, 1982), Autumn Sojourn (Em Press, 1995), and The Firecage (a+bend press, 2000).

She has edited an edition of Emily Dickinson's poetry for Shambhala Publications, and, with Patricia Dienstfrey, co-edited The Grand Permission: New Writings on Poetics and Motherhood (2003). With Paul Ebenkamp, she co-edited Writing the Silences, New California Poetry (2010). She co-translated, with Diallah Haidar, Poems from Above the Hill: Selected Poems of Ashur Etwebi, one of Libya's most significant poets. In 2010 she co-translated Jeongrye Choi's book of poems, Instances, released by Parlor Press.

Hillman has been increasingly interested in the innovative and experimental lyric traditions, particularly in how the Romantic concepts of nature and spirit have manifested in contemporary poetry. In her essay entitled “Split, Spark, and Space,” Hillman writes about the emergence of different kinds of lyric impulses in her writing: “The sense of a single ‘voice’ in poetry grew to include polyphonies, oddly collective dictations, and the process of writing itself. This happened in part because of a rediscovered interest in esoteric western tradition and in part because I came to a community of women who were writing in exploratory forms...A poetic method which had heretofore been based on waiting for insight suddenly had to accommodate process, and indeterminate physics, a philosophy of detached looking.”

Critical reception 
Hillman’s early poetry collections received critical praise for their transfiguration of experience. With the publication of Loose Sugar, however, Hillman acquired a formidable reputation in the world of contemporary poetry. Cascadia and Pieces of Air in the Epic both use complicated structures to achieve what Forrest Gander has called “poetic architectures.” Hillman spoke to Poets and Writers about her process of composition in Cascadia: “One of the ideas I got from André Breton when I read him in college is the use of chance as anchor. I would arbitrarily choose words and make myself use them to anchor the rest of the writing to the page…in the long poem, ‘A Geology,’ the corner words ‘anchor’ the rest of the poem to the page so it wouldn't float.”

Reviewing Practical Water for the Boston Review, Craig Morgan Teicher spoke to Hillman’s process: “Hillman has charted her own unusual course, borrowing things—a mixture of conversational and high-lyric diction, an emphasis on language’s materiality, an interest in metaphysics and occult knowledge, and a passionate environmental and political consciousness—from pretty much every major poetic movement of the last century.” Practical Water even includes transcripts from congressional hearings, in which Hillman tries to “seek out the humanity behind policy and policymakers.”

The fourth volume in the series, Seasonal Works With Letters on Fire, was a long-list finalist for the National Book Award and won a California Book Award Gold Medal; the Northern California Book Award for Poetry; and the International Griffin Poetry Prize. The Judges’ Citation for the Griffin hails Hillman's latest: “Seasonal Works appears to be one of the most inclusive books a hyper-active imagination could wring out of the actual. The symbols of the alphabet come alive and perform acrobatic marvels. Phonetical bird calls join in on cue. The mighty challenges of now are fully engaged. The book performs an ‘anarchic music’ and stimulates a craving for undiluted love, and a rollicking fury for justice that only its widely variant forms can sustain. This is a unique work.”

Dean Rader also praised the work, writing “Seasonal Works With Letters On Fire is a profoundly humane work. In language that moves from the chatty to the experimental to the heightened to the rhetorical, Hillman shows us once again that poetry is itself a tireless worker, always on our behalf.”

Praising Hillman’s deft handling of form and subject, Marjorie Welish has stated, “each poem that Hillman writes creates its own experimental configuration, within which the phrase swerves and discombobulates sense, as several registers of subject complicate the sampling of experiences and also as the experimental format throws the lyric into symbolic disarray one moment and naturalist scrutiny the next. And even more: she writes as if the lyric poem had a political calling.”

Awards 
 2019 Northern California Book Award for Extra Hidden Life, among the Days
 2014 International Griffin Poetry Prize for Seasonal Works with Letters on Fire
 2009 Los Angeles Times Book Prize for poetry
 2005 William Carlos Williams Prize for poetry
 National Endowment for the Arts Fellowship
 1994 Guggenheim Fellowship
 Pushcart Prize

Bibliography

Books
  Winner of 2019 Northern California Book Award
 , shortlisted for the 2014 Griffin Poetry Prize 
 , 2009 Los Angeles Times Book Prize in the Poetry category
 
 
 , a finalist for National Book Critics Circle Award
 , a finalist for Pulitzer Prize
 

 White Dress. Wesleyan University Press. 1985.

Chapbooks
 The Firecage (a+bend press, 2000)
 Autumn Sojourn (Em Press, 1995)
 Coffee, 3 A.M. (Penumbra Press, 1982)

Edited
 

Brenda Hillman, ed. (1995). The Pocket Emily Dickinson. Shambhala Publications.

Translations 
 Diallah Haidar, Brenda Hillman, trans. Poems from Above the Hill: Selected Poems of Ashur Etwebi.
 Brenda Hillman, co-trans. (2010). Jeongrye Choi. Instances. Parlor Press.

In Anthology 
 Lucille Lang Day and Ruth Nolan, eds. (2018). Fire and Rain: Ecopoetry of California. Scarlet Tanager Books.
 Melissa Tuckey, ed. (2018). Ghost Fishing: An Eco-Justice Poetry Anthology. University of Georgia Press.

References

External links
 Brenda Hillman, poets.org
 Brenda Hillman, blueflowerarts
 Brenda Hillman, Poetry Foundation
 Interview: Brenda Hillman, writersatcornell, November 7, 2008
 Readings in Contemporary Poetry: Brenda Hillman, Brighde Mullins, Dia Art Foundation
 “'Platonic Oxygen': On Brenda Hillman’s Pieces of Air in the Epic", Brenda McCabe, Denver Quarterly
 An interview with Brenda Hillman in Memorious
 2003 interview with Rain Taxi

1951 births
Living people
Iowa Writers' Workshop alumni
Iowa Writers' Workshop faculty
20th-century American poets
American women poets
National Endowment for the Arts Fellows
20th-century American women writers
21st-century American poets
Saint Mary's College of California
Pomona College alumni
Poets from Arizona
Writers from Tucson, Arizona
21st-century American women writers